Baykan District is a district of Siirt Province in Turkey. The town of Baykan is the seat and the district had a population of 21,321 in 2021.

The district was established in 1938.

Settlements 
The district encompasses the seat of Baykan, two beldes, thirty villages and thirty-six hamlets.

Municipalities 

 Atabağı
 Veyselkarani

Villages 

 Adakale
 Ardıçdalı
 Çamtaşı
 Çaykaya
 Çelikli
 Çevrimtepe
 Çukurca
 Dedebakırı
 Demirışık
 Derince
 Dilektepe
 Dokuzçavuş
 Engin
 Gümüşkaş
 Günbuldu
 Gündoğdu
 İkizler
 Karakaya
 Kasımlı
 Meşelik
 Narlıyurt
 Obalı
 Ormanpınar
 Sarıdana
 Sarısalkım
 Tütenocak
 Ulaştı
 Ünlüce
 Yarımca
 Yeşilçevre

References 

Districts of Siirt Province